Henry James Thoms (16 November 1896–1970) was an English footballer who played in the Football League for Crystal Palace, Derby County and Hartlepools United.

References

1896 births
1970 deaths
English footballers
Association football midfielders
English Football League players
Hartlepool United F.C. players
Derby County F.C. players
Crystal Palace F.C. players
Glentoran F.C. players